End of the Century is a 1980 album by the Ramones.

End of the Century may also refer to:
 End of the Century: The Story of the Ramones, a 2003 documentary film about the Ramones
 End of the Century (Boris the Sprinkler album), a 1996 album that is a complete cover of the Ramones album
 End of the Century (film), a 2019 Argentine film

See also
 Fin de siècle, French for "end of century"
 "End of a Century", a 1994 song by Blur